Below is a list of  nominations and appointments to the Department of Commerce by Joe Biden, the 46th president of the United States. , according to tracking by The Washington Post and Partnership for Public Service, 21 nominees have been confirmed, 1 position does not have a nominee, and 1 position that doesn't require Senate confirmation does not have an appointee.

Color key 
 Denotes appointees awaiting Senate confirmation.

 Denotes appointees serving in an acting capacity.

 Denotes appointees who have left office or offices which have been disbanded.

Leadership

Office of the Secretary & Deputy Secretary

Office of Economic Affairs

Office of Industry and Security

Office of International Trade

Office of Oceans & Atmosphere and the National Oceanic and Atmospheric Administration

Other Under Secretaries

Withdrawn nominations

See also 
 Cabinet of Joe Biden, for the vetting process undergone by top-level roles including advice and consent by the Senate
 List of executive branch 'czars' e.g. Special Advisor to the President

Notes 

Confirmations by roll call vote

Confirmations by voice vote

References 

 Biden
Commerce